The Coolidge Cricket Ground is a cricket ground in Osbourn, Saint George Parish, Antigua. It was previously known as the Airport Cricket Ground, before it was taken over by American businessman and cricket enthusiast Allen Stanford, rebuilt in 2004 and named the Stanford Cricket Ground. It was used as one of the many home grounds of the Leeward Islands and also hosted many Twenty20 matches, including both the 2006 & 2008 Stanford 20/20 tournaments and the 2008 Stanford Super Series. Stanford was convicted of fraud and multiple violations of US securities laws on 6 March 2012 and sentenced to 110 years in prison, and the stadium's name was changed to the Coolidge Cricket Ground in 2016-17 and it resumed staging cricket matches after an eight-year hiatus.

The stadium also hosted football matches for Antigua Barracuda FC of USL Pro from 2011 to 2012.

In February 2021, it was selected to host its first official International matches to be played by the West Indies Men's team during Sri Lanka tour of the West Indies.  On 3 March 2021, Kieron Pollard became only the third player to hit six sixes in an over in international cricket, off the bowling of Akila Dananjaya.

This ground has hosted many matches of 2022 ICC Under-19 Cricket World Cup.

References

External links
 Cricinfo.com: Coolidge Cricket Ground profile webpage
 Cricket Archive.com: Coolidge Cricket Ground records

Cricket grounds in Antigua and Barbuda
Saint George Parish, Antigua and Barbuda
Football venues in Antigua and Barbuda
Sports venues completed in 2004
2004 establishments in Antigua and Barbuda